Jakub Jelonek (born 7 July 1985 in Częstochowa) is a Polish race walker.

Achievements

References
 

1985 births
Living people
Polish male racewalkers
Athletes (track and field) at the 2008 Summer Olympics
Athletes (track and field) at the 2016 Summer Olympics
Olympic athletes of Poland
Sportspeople from Częstochowa